
The 2018 Sunderland City Council election took place on 3 May 2018 to elect members of Sunderland City Council in England. The election took place on the same day as other local elections.

Background 
In the period since the previous local elections in 2016, the Liberal Democrats had won two seats from Labour in by-elections: in January 2017 in Sandhill ward, and February 2018 in Pallion ward.

The Labour, Conservative and Green Parties all fielded 25 candidates in the election. The Liberal Democrats fielded 22 candidates, and there were 4 Independent candidates. UKIP did not field any candidates, despite taking 11% of the vote at the previous election. The election saw a debut for the Populist Party and For Britain, fielding one candidate each.

Election results 
The election saw Labour defend 16 seats and gain one seat, winning the Copt Hill ward from an Independent councillor. The Liberal Democrats took seats from Labour in Millfield, Pallion, and Sandhill. The Conservatives held the seats they were defending in Fulwell, St Michael's, and St Peter's, and gained from Labour in St Chad's and Barnes.

The election result was the worst for the Labour Party in Sunderland since 2012. It was the Conservatives' best result since 2008, and the best result for the Liberal Democrats since 1982 (when they stood as the SDP/Liberal Alliance).

The overall turnout was 32.9%

This resulted in the following composition of the council:

Ward by ward results
Asterisk denotes incumbent councillor.

Barnes Ward

†Antony Mullen was suspended by the Conservative Party during the election, and was under investigation due to a series of offensive social media posts he has made about Sunderland and Labour MP Diane Abbott. He remained on the ballot as a Conservative candidate, and was reinstated after being elected. The investigation showed no wrong whatsoever and he was fully reinstated.

Castle Ward

†Swing to the Labour candidate from UKIP, who had stood last time this seat was contested.

Copt Hill Ward

Doxford Ward

†Swing to the Labour candidate from UKIP, who had stood last time this seat was contested.

Fulwell Ward

†Swing to the Conservative candidate from UKIP, who had stood last time this seat was contested.

Hendon Ward

Hetton Ward

†Swing to the Labour candidate from UKIP, who had stood last time this seat was contested.

Houghton Ward

†Swing to Labour from an Independent candidate, who had stood last time this seat was contested.

Millfield Ward

Pallion Ward

A by-election had been held in one of the other seats in Pallion Ward in February 2018 following the death of the incumbent Labour councillor. The by-election was won by the Liberal Democrats.

Redhill Ward

†Swing to the Labour candidate from UKIP, who had stood last time this seat was contested.

Ryhope Ward

†Swing to the Labour candidate from UKIP, who had stood last time this seat was contested.

Sandhill Ward

A by-election had been held in one of the other seats in Sandhill Ward in January 2017 following the disqualification of the incumbent Labour councillor for non-attendance. The by-election was won by the Liberal Democrats.

Shiney Row Ward

†Swing to the Labour candidate from UKIP, who had stood last time this seat was contested.

Silksworth Ward

Southwick Ward

†Swing to the Labour candidate from UKIP, who had stood last time this seat was contested.

St Anne's Ward

†Swing to the Labour candidate from UKIP, who had stood last time this seat was contested.

St Chad's Ward

St Michael's Ward

†Swing to the Conservative candidate from UKIP, who had stood last time this seat was contested.

St Peter's Ward

†Swing to the Conservative candidate from UKIP, who had stood last time this seat was contested.

Washington Central Ward

†Swing to the Labour candidate from UKIP, who had stood last time this seat was contested.

Washington East Ward

†Swing to the Labour candidate from UKIP, who had stood last time this seat was contested.

Washington North Ward

†Swing to the Labour candidate from UKIP, who had stood last time this seat was contested.

Washington South Ward

†Swing to the Labour candidate from UKIP, who had stood last time this seat was contested.

Washington West Ward

†Swing to the Labour candidate from UKIP, who had stood last time this seat was contested.

References

2018 English local elections
2018
21st century in Tyne and Wear